Targetoid hemosiderotic hemangioma, also known as a hobnail hemangioma is a skin condition characterized by a central brown or purplish papule that is surrounded by an ecchymotic halo.

It may appear similar to melanoma.

It was first described by Santa Cruz and Aronberg in 1988.

See also 
 Skin lesion
 List of cutaneous conditions

References 

Dermal and subcutaneous growths